Eugenia roxburghii (commonly known as Roxburgh's Cherry) is a species of plant in the family Myrtaceae which is native to India and Sri Lanka. Leaves are shiny green in color which are oppositely arranged. Flowers are white in color and have four-petals. Fruit is a deep orange-colored berry. Flowering starts on March and ends with late April.

References

roxburghii
Flora of the Indian subcontinent
Flora of Indo-China
Taxa named by Augustin Pyramus de Candolle